Lotrando a Zubejda is a Czech musical fairy tale film directed by Karel Smyczek and written by Zdeněk Svěrák as an adaptation of two fairy tales: "Doctors" and "Highwaymen", by Karel Čapek, from the book Niner Fairytales: And One More Thrown in for Good Measure.

Cast and characters
 Jiří Strach as Lotrando
 Barbora Seidlová as Zubejda
 Pavel Zedníček as Drnec
 Arnošt Goldflam as Mr. Lustig
 Jiří Lábus as Vince
 Jiří Pecha as Old Lotrando
 Marián Labuda as Sultan
 Miroslav Táborský as Hali
 Ladislav Gerendáš as Beli
 Jaroslav Sypal as Zeli
 Ljuba Krbová as La Mad
 Josef Karlík as Prior
 Vladimír Javorský as Father Amadeus
 Jaroslava Krettschmerová as Stepmother
 Naďa Konvalinková as Drnec's wife
 Barbora Srncová as Anna
 Oldřich Navrátil as Muezzin

Synopsis
The story is about a boy (Lotrando) who was born into a band of robbers in Bohemia. Unfortunately, Lotrando didn't have a mom. He wanted to go to study, which he was finally allowed to do. When he graduated, his dad was dying and told him that from now on he was the leader of the bandits. Well, but of course the student didn't know, how to be a good robber, so the whole gang made fun of him. He went away and in the forest he met a woodcutter (Drnec) who taught him how to cut trees. One day, in a faraway exotic place, a rare princess (Zubejda), the Sultan's only daughter, fell ill. So, the Sultan sent three messengers to find the doctor. (A doctor has the title Dr. in Czech Republic) When they found that [dr]voštěp (woodcutter) [Dr]nec, they figured out it must be a doctor if he had "Dr" in his name twice. They brought him and his younger colleague to see the princess. 
They saw tall trees all over the place of Zubejda's home. Because they were both woodcutters, they decided to cut all of the trees. Sultan wasn't really happy. But when Zubejda saw the sunlight, smell their food and tried it, she was completely cured. But... Lotrando fell ill! Princess's maid asked him, where does it hurt, and she soon find out, he's in love with princess. Also Lotrando find out, the maid is actually his mother. So Lotrando and Zubejda have a wedding and they lived together for the rest of their lives.

External links
 Lotrando and Zubejda -> ČSFD.cz
 Lotrando and Zubejda -> ČFN.cz

Czech musical fantasy films
Czech plays
1997 films
1990s musical films
Films with screenplays by Zdeněk Svěrák
Adaptations of works by Karel Čapek
Films based on fairy tales